This is a timeline of notable events during the period of Muslim presence in Iberia, starting with the Umayyad conquest in the 8th century.

Conquest (711–756)

 711A Muslim force consisting of Arabs and Berbers of about 7,000 soldiers under general Tariq ibn Ziyad, loyal to the Umayyad Caliph Al-Walid I, enters the Iberian peninsula from North Africa.
 At the Battle of Guadalete, Tariq ibn Ziyad defeats Visigothic king Roderic.
 712The Muslim governor of Northern Africa, Musa ibn Nusayr, follows Tariq ibn Ziyad with an army of 5,000 Arabs to make the total of the army 12,000. He takes Medina-Sidonia, Seville and Mértola.
 713Abd al-Aziz ibn Musa, Musa ibn Nusair's son, takes Jaén, Murcia, Granada, Sagunto.
 714First Umayyad campaigns in the lower Ebro valley and southeast part of the Iberian Peninsula.
 Abd al-Aziz ibn Musa takes Évora, Santarém and Coimbra.
 715Abd al-Aziz ibn Musa is left in charge and makes his capital the city of Seville. The Al-Walid's successor, Sulayman ibn Abd al-Malik, orders Abd al-Aziz ibn Musa assassinated.
 717Córdoba becomes the capital of Muslim Al-Andalus.
 718Pelayo, a Christian Asturian noble and possibly (but not certainly) comrade-in-arms of King Roderic at the Battle of Guadalete, leads the fight against the Umayyads in the Asturian region.
 720The Umayyads conquer Barcelona and Narbonne and Septimania.
 721A combined force of Aquitanians and Franks under Duke Odo of Aquitaine defeat an Umayyad army at the Battle of Toulouse.
 725Anbasa ibn Suhaym al-Kalbi raids Autun in Burgundy, Frankish Kingdom.
 731Berbers allied of Odo of Aquitaine rebel in Cerdanya, but the rebellion is suppressed by Abdul Rahman Al Ghafiqi.
 732The Cordovan army led by Abdul Rahman Al Ghafiqi defeats an Aquitanian force under Duke Odo of Aquitaine on the Garonne next to Bordeaux.
 Frankish commander Charles Martel and Odo defeat an Umayyad army at the Battle of Tours-Poitiers, killing Abdul Rahman Al Ghafiqi.
 735Umayyads take Arles in the Rhône Valley.
 739Berbers revolt in North Africa, thereafter expanding to Iberia.
 Rebels in North Africa defeat a Syrian force and kill its commander Kulthum.
 Revolt drives Muslim army out of Galicia.
 740Berbers rebel against the ethnically exclusive Arab Umayyad Caliphate and refuse to support them with tax revenues.
 741The 10,000 survivors of Kulthum's force arrive in Iberia under a new leader, Talaba ibn Salama.
 742Internal conflict in Al-Andalus continues for the next 4 years.
 755Abd ar-Rahman I of the Umayyad dynasty flees to Iberia to escape the Abbasids.
 756Abd ar-Rahman I defeats Yusuf al-Fihri outside Córdoba.

The Umayyad Emirate of Córdoba (756–929)
 756Abd ar-Rahman I proclaims himself Emir of Córdoba.
 759The Andalusis lose the city of Narbonne, last Muslim stronghold north of the Pyrenees.
 764Abd ar-Rahman I takes Toledo from Hisham ibn Urwa.
 766Said al-Matari rebels in Seville.
 771Syrians under Abd al-Ghaffar rebel against Abd ar-Rahman I, but the latter defeats the Syrians on the river Bembezar in 774.
 777Abd ar-Rahman I suppresses an Abbasid-inspired revolt.
 778The Franks led by Charlemagne attack Zaragoza, but are forced to withdraw empty-handed.
 785Building of the Great Mosque of Córdoba begins on the grounds of a Visigothic church; it is completed in 976.
 788Death of Abd ar-Rahman I, founder of the independent Umayyad Emirate of Córdoba. His successor is Hisham I.
 791Alfonso II becomes King of Asturias in Oviedo and takes a number of Andalusi strongholds and settles the lands south of the Douro River.
 791Battle of the Burbia River, where the Umayyad Cordovans defeat the Asturians.
 A Muslim force raids into Galicia.
 792Hisham I, Emir of Córdoba, calls for a Jihad against the Christians in the Marca Hispanica and Gothia (eastern Pyrenees).
 794Asturians defeat the Umayyad Cordovans at the Battle of Lutos.
 795An Umayyad force occupies Astorga.
 796Al-Hakam I becomes Emir of Córdoba.
 798In a raid across western al-Andalus, Alfonso II of Asturias captures and sacks Lisbon, but does not retain it.
 799Basques revolt and kill the local Cordovan governor in Pamplona (Mutarrif ibn-Musa).
 800Charlemagne takes Barcelona. He is granted the title of "Holy Roman Emperor" by Pope Leo III in order to guarantee his protection of Rome against the invading Lombards.
 801William of Gellone and Louis the Pious, Charlemagne's son, take Barcelona from Andalusi lords.
 806Frankish conquest of Pamplona.
 808Franks fail to take Tortosa.
 809An Umayyad prince defeats and executes Tumlus, a Muslim rebel who had seized power in Lisbon some years before.
 811Charlemagne fails to take control of Tarragona; "Hispanic March" (designation until 874) established to the south of Barcelona.
 813The grave of James the Apostle is 'revealed' near Santiago de Compostela, in Galicia.
 816Forces of the Emirate of Cordoba under Abd al-Karim ibn Abd al-Wahid defeat a force loyal to the Kingdom of Francia under Balask al-Yalasqi.
 822Abd-ar-Rahman II becomes Emir of Córdoba.
 824Basques destroy a Carolingian army at the second Battle of Roncesvalles. Kingdom of Pamplona established.
 825Andalusian forces attempt to invade Christian territory from Coimbra and Viseu but are driven back.
 827Bernat of Septimania holds Barcelona against Gothic rebels who have Umayyad assistance.
 829Another insurrection in Mérida.
 839Alfonso II of Asturias commands a military force in the region of Viseu.
 844Vikings raid the Galician estuaries, are defeated by Ramiro I, attack Lisbon, and sack Seville, but are shortly afterwards wiped out by a Córdoban relief army.
 Battle of Clavijo, a fictitious battle between Christians led by Ramiro I of Asturias and Muslims, where St. James is claimed to have aided a Christian Army.
 848William, son of Bernat of Septimania, seizes Barcelona.
 850859Perfectus, a Christian priest in Andalusi Córdoba, is beheaded after refusing to retract numerous insults hurled at Muhammad. Numerous other priests, monks, and laity would follow.
 Forty-eight Christian men and women are decapitated for refusing to convert or recurrently blaspheming MuhammadMartyrs of Córdoba.
 852Death of Abd at-Rahman II.
 Muhammad I becomes Emir of Córdoba.
 859Vikings raid the Iberian coast. They capture and ransom King García Íñiguez of Pamplona.
 859Ordoño I of Asturias defeats Musa ibn Musa at Albelda.
 871The city of Coimbra is taken from the Moors. Hermenegildo Gutiérrez is made Count of Coimbra.
 873Over the next 25 years Wilfred the Hairy, Count of Barcelona, sets up a Christian principality with a certain degree of independence from the Frankish kings.
 886Al-Mundhir becomes Emir of Córdoba.
 Revolts in Al-Andalus continue till 912
 888Abdallah ibn Muhammad becomes Emir of Córdoba.
 905Sancho I of Pamplona usurps the Basque kingdom of Pamplona with the help of Alfonso III of León, Raymond I, Count of Pallars and Ribagorza and the Banu Qasi.
 912Abd al-Rahman III becomes the Emir of Córdoba. Every spring, Emirate troops or those of vassals launch raiding campaigns against the Christian frontier.
 913An expedition commanded by Ordoño II of León takes Évora (Talavera) from the Muslims.
 The capital city of the Kingdom of Asturias is moved from Oviedo to León, becomes Kingdom of León.
 916Ordoño II of León is defeated by Emir Abd al-Rahman III in Valdejunquera.
 917Battle of San Esteban de Gormaz. Ordoño II defeats an army under Emir Abd al-Rahman III.
 919The Muslims again attack the city of San Esteban de Gormaz at the Battle of San Esteban de Gormaz (919)
 Pope John X recognizes the orthodoxy and legitimacy of the Visigothic Liturgy maintained in the Mozarabic rite.
 920Battle of Valdejunquera, where the armies of Abd al-Rahman III defeat the armies of the Kingdom of León.
 920Muslim forces under the command of Abd al-Rahman III take the city of San Esteban de Gormaz
 920Muslim forces cross the Pyrenees, enter Gascony, and reach as far as the gates of Toulouse. The garrison of Muez is killed.
 924The city of Pamplona is destroyed by forces led by Abd al-Rahman III.

The Umayyad Caliphate (929–1031)
 929Abd al-Rahman III, faced with the threat of invasion by the Fatimids, proclaims himself Caliph of Córdoba, breaking all ties with the Abbasid Caliphate in Baghdad. Under the reign of Abd al-Rahman III Muslim Al-Andalus reaches its greatest height before its slow decline over the next four centuries.
 930Over the next 20 years Ramiro II of León, defeats Abd al-Rahman III at Simancas, Osma, and Talavera.
 933Battle of Osma where Castilian–Leónese troops, under Fernán González of Castile, defeat the Muslim army of Abd al-Rahman III.
 939Battle of Simancas where Ramiro II of León defeats Abd al-Rahman III. Christians defeat Al-nasir at Alhandega.
 Madrid is recaptured from Muslim forces. The encounter between the two rulers finally took place in 939, when, at the so-called ditch of Simancas (Shant Mankus), Ramiro II of León severely defeated the Muslims, and Abd al-Rahman III narrowly escapes with his life. After that defeat Abd al-Rahman III resolved never to take personal charge of another expedition. But Madrid recaptured by Muslims in 940.
 953Emperor Otto I sends representatives to Córdoba to ask Caliph Abd al-Rahman III to call off some Muslim raiders who had set themselves up in Alpine passes and are attacking merchant caravans going in and out of Italy.
 Big Moorish incursion in Galicia.
 955Ordoño III of León attacks Lisbon.
 961Al-Hakam II becomes Umayyad Caliph of Córdoba.
 974A Córdoban expedition under Ibn Tumlus crushes a rebellion in Seville.
 976Caliph Al-Hakam II dies, and Al-Mansur takes over in the name of his protégé Hisham II, becoming a military dictator usurping caliphal powers and launching a big number of offensive campaigns against the Christians. The Christians take advantage of the resulting confusion and commence raids into Muslim territory.
 Al-Mansur sacks Barcelona.
 977Al-Mansur volunteers to lead the army against the Christians, and is successful.
 978Leonese forces under Garci Fernández and Ramiro III of León suffer the worst in a string of defeats at San Esteban de Gormaz (Also defeated at Rueda and Torrevicente), eventually leading to the revolt of the Galacian nobles and the abdication of Ramiro in favor of Bermudo II of León.
 981Al-Mansur defeats his old friend Ghalib in a confused battle near Atienza. Al-Mansur force includes Berbers, Christian mercenaries, and Andalusian troops from Zaragoza under Man ibn Abd al-Aziz al-Tujibi. Ghalib's force includes Andalusians and a Castilian contingent under the Count García Fernandez. Ghalib is killed in the battle. Al-Mansur subsequently kills off both Ibn al-Andalusi and Man ibn Abd al-Aziz al-Tujibi.
 981Ramiro III of León is defeated by Al-Mansur at Rueda at the Battle of Rueda and is obliged to pay tribute to the Caliph of Córdoba.
 983After failing in a rebellion in the Maghreb, the Berber Chief Zawi ibn Ziri, of the Tunisian royal family, brings a formidable force of Sanhaja horsemen to join Al-Mansur. However, they are not allowed to cross the straits for many years (sometime 10021008).
 985Under Al-Mansur and subsequently his son, Christian cities are subjected to numerous raids.
 985Al-Mansur sacks Barcelona.
 986Al-Mansur burns down the monastery of Sant Cugat del Vallès.
 987Al-Mansur lays waste to Christian Coimbra.
 Al-Mansur seizes the castles north of the Douro River, and arrives at the city of Santiago de Compostela. The city had been evacuated and Al-Mansur burns it to the ground.
 Al-Mansur has the basilica doors and bells of the Christian shrine of Santiago de Compostela taken to the Córdoba Mosque and has the rest of the Church destroyed.
 988Al-Mansur razes León to the ground. He sacks Leon, Zamora, and Sahagun, and sets fire to the great monasteries of Eslonza and Sahagun.
 989Al-Mansur seizes Osma.
 995Despite stout resistance by the Beni-Gomez clanChristian counts of Saldaña, Liébana, Carrión, and ZamoraAl-Mansur destroys their capital, the city of Santa Maria de Carrion.
 997Under the leadership of Al-Mansur, Muslim forces march out of the city of Córdoba and head north to capture Christian lands.
 998Wadih, a Slav and the best Andalusian commander of the time, takes Fez in Morocco with a large force.
 Muslims briefly attempt to establish a garrison at Zamora.
 1000Sancho III of Navarre, inflicts major losses on the Muslims, and nearly clinches a remarkable victory.
 1000–1033Sancho III of Navarre gains control of Aragon and Castile, uniting the three kingdoms. But on his death, he splits the kingdom and leaves Navarre to his son García III of Pamplona, Castile to Fernando I, and Aragon to Ramiro I.
 1002Al-Mansur raids into La Rioja.
 Al-Mansur dies in the village of Salem.
 Power in Al-Andalus subsequently divided between the old Arab nobility, the Berber mercenaries, and the Slav slaves.
 10021008Al-Mansur's son Al-Muzaffar conducts annual raids against the Christians.
 1003Moors lay waste to the city of León.
 1008On the death of al-Muzaffar, Abd al-Rahman ibn Al-Mansur, another son of Al-Mansur, takes over the role of unofficial ruler. In winter he leads his army against the Christians.
 Muhammad II – great-grandson of Abd al-Rahman III – deposes Hisham II as Caliph and destroys Al-Mansur's palace complex of al-Madinat al-Zahira near Córdoba.
 Mohammed II al-Mahdi becomes Umayyad Caliph of Córdoba.
 The period of anarchy over the next 23 years out of which emerged approximately two dozen taifa states.
 1009Muslims lay waste to León again.
 The Berbers are expelled from Córdoba and set up camp at Calatrava. Their Generals nominate another descendant of Abd al-Rahman III – Sulayman al-Mustain – as a rival Caliph.
 Suleiman seeks the aid of Count Sancho García of Castile against Mohammed II of Umayyad. The joint Berber-Castilian army defeats the Arab militia of Muhammad II and sacks Córdoba.
 Sulaiman al-Mustain becomes Umayyad Caliph of Córdoba as Suleiman II, after deposing Mohammed II.
 The Taifa (independent Moorish kingdom) of Badajoz becomes independent of the Caliph of Córdoba and governs the territory between Coimbra and North Alentejo.
 1010
 Having fled to Toledo, Mohammed II seeks the aid of Ramon Borrell, Count of Barcelona and Urgel. The Catalan army defeats Sulaiman II's Berbers at Aqabat al-Baqar and again near the river Guadiaro (near Ronda).
 Mohammed II reclaims Córdoba supported by the Slav General Wadih, but is assassinated.
 Hisham II is restored as Umayyad Caliph of Córdoba by slave troops of the Caliphate under Wahdid.
 1012Berber forces capture Córdoba and order that half the population be executed.
 Sulaiman II is restored as Umayyad Caliph of Córdoba by the Berber armies.
 1013A Berber reign of terror in Córdoba that kills the deposed Hisham II.
 The powerless Sulaiman II is forced to hand out provincial governorships to the Berber chiefs.
 Jews are expelled from the Umayyad Caliphate of Córdoba, then ruled by Suleiman II.
 Samuel ibn Naghrillah flees to Málaga when Suleiman attacks Córdoba.
 Samuel ibn Naghrillah becomes vizier to the Emir of Granada, as does his son, Joseph ibn Naghrela. Many other Jews flee to Granada.
 Caliphate of Córdoba begins to break up. Many Taifas (independent Moorish kingdoms) begin to spring up.
 1014The Berber chief Zawi ibn Ziri – leader of the Sanhaja confederation, and a member of the Tunisian royal family – makes Granada his capital.
 1015The Emir of Denia, Mujāhid al-‘Āmirī, sets out from his base in the Balearic Islands with a fleet of 125 ships in an attempt to take Sardinia.
 Ali ibn Hammud, Emir of Ceuta, declares himself the rightful Caliph and marches on Córdoba. A Berber general deposes and executes Caliph Suleiman II.
 Mujāhid al-‘Āmirī is dislodged from Sardinia by a force from Genoa and Pisa.
 1018Self-proclaimed Caliph Ali ibn Hammud assassinated in Córdoba. His brother Al-Qasim replaces him. The Zirids of Granada defeat an Andalusian army of 4,000 under Abd ar-Rahman IV al-Mutadathe Umayyad claimant.
 The Taifa of the Algarve becomes independent.
 1021Abd-ar-Rahman IV becomes Umayyad Caliph of Córdoba.
 Yahya, the son of Ali ibn Hammud al-Nasir, rebels in Málaga with the support of the Berbers.
 1022Abd-ar-Rahman V becomes Umayyad Caliph of Córdoba with the support of Berber troops.
 The Taifa (independent Moorish kingdom) of Lisbon emerges. It will be annexed by the Taifa of Badajoz.
 1023Muhammad III becomes Umayyad Caliph of Córdoba with the support of Berber troops.
 The Abbadid Emir of Seville, Abu al-Qasim Muhammad ibn Abbad, declares independence from Muhammad III, Umayyad Caliph of Córdoba.
 1025Abu al-Qasim Muhammad ibn Abbad, Abbadid Emir of Seville, captures two castles at Alafões to the north-west of Viseu.
 1027Hisham III becomes Umayyad Caliph of Córdoba.
 1028Alfonso V, king of Asturias and León, lays siege to Viseu but is killed by a bolt from the walls.
 The Moorish Caliphate of Córdoba falls.

Political fragmentation (1031–1130) 
 1031The Moorish Caliphate of Córdoba falls.
 Hisham III, the last of the Umayyad Caliphs disappears into obscurity.
 1033The Taifa (independent Moorish kingdom) of Mértola becomes independent.
 1034The Leonese destroy a raiding force under Ismail ibn Abbad of Seville. Ismail ibn Abbad flees to Lisbon.
 Gonçalo Trastemires – a Portuguese frontiersman – captures Montemor castle on the Mondego river.
 Over the next 28 years Ferdinand I of León takes Coimbra and obliges the Muslims of Toledo, Seville, and Badajoz to pay him tribute. Before his death, he divides his territories between his sons: Castile goes to Sancho II, León to Alfonso VI of León and Castile and Galicia to Garcia II.
 Bermudo III of León defeats the Moors in César, in the Aveiro region.
 1038Granadine armies under the vizier wage almost continuous war against their Muslim neighbours, primarily Seville.
 1040The Taifa of Silves becomes independent.
 1043Zaragoza and Toledo fight over the border city of Guadalajara. Toledo pays the Navarrese to raid into Zaragoza; similarly, Zaragoza pays the León–Castilians to raid into Toledo. The Christian armies ravage the respective Muslim lands unchecked.
 Rodrigo Diaz Vivar, whom the Muslims would name "El Cid Campeador" (Lord Winner of Battles) is born in Burgos.
 1044Abbad III al-Mu'tamid, son of the Abbadid Emir of Seville Abbad II al-Mu'tadid, retakes Mértola, since 1033 an independent Taifa.
 1051Yusuf ibn Hud, the Banu Hud Emir of Lleida, is paying the Catalans to protect against his own family in Zaragoza.
 The Taifa of the Algarve is annexed by the Taifa of Seville.
 1053Emir Al-Mutadid of Seville drives Berbers from Arcos, Morón and Ronda.
 1054Battle of Atapuerca. The army of Ferdinand I of Castile defeats that of his brother García III of Navarra, near Burgos. Several disaffected Navarrese knights join the Castilians before the battle and one of these men is believed to have killed Garcia. Garcia's son Sancho is proclaimed King on the field of battle and the war continues.
 1055Emir Al-Mutadid of Seville drives Berbers from Algeciras.
 1056The Almoravids (al-Murabitun) Dynasty begins its rise to power. This Berber dynasty who would rule North Africa and Islamic Iberia until 1147.
 1057Emir Al-Mutadid of Seville drives Almoravids from Carmona.
 Ferdinand I of Castile-León takes Lamego from the Moors.
 1058Emir Al-Muzaffar al-Aftas (Abu Bekr Muhammad al-MudaffarModafar I of Badajoz, Aftid Dynasty) pays the Christians to leave Badajoz, but not before Ferdinand I of Castile-León takes Viseu.
 10601063Council (Ecumenical Synod) of Santiago de Compostela.
 1060The heretic Berghouata Berbers set up a Taifa in Ceuta, but are eventually crushed by the Almoravids.
 Ferdinand I of León imposes an annual tribute on Muslim Zaragoza. Emir Al-Muktadir ibn Hud of Zaragoza drives Slavs from Tortosa when the Tortosans rise against their Slav ruler.
 1062Ferdinand I of Castile and León invades Muslim Toledo with a large army. Emir Al-Mamun becomes a tributary of Castile. Ferdinand then invades Muslim Badajoz, and extracts tribute from Emir Al-Mutadid of Seville.
 1063Battle of Graus. During spring, Ramiro I of Aragon besieges Muslim Graus in Zaragozan territory. The Emir al-Muqtadir of Zaragoza leads his army north accompanied by a Castilian contingent under Prince Sancho (the future Sancho II). Rodrigo Díaz de Vivar later known as El Cid is probably in the Castilian contingent. The opposing armies meet and after a protracted struggle Ramiro I is killed and the Aragonese flee (8 May 1063). Pope Alexander II sends an international force to Spain under his standard bearer William of Montreuil. It includes Italian knights, Normans (Robert Crespin, Baron of Lower Normandy), Frenchmen (William, Count of Poitiers and Duke of Aquitaine), and Iberians (Bishop of Vic; Count Ermengol II of Urgel). At the start of July the expedition besieges Barbastro in the Muslim Kingdom of Lleida. The Emir of Lleida (the brother of Muktadir of Zaragoza) makes no attempt to relieve the siege and after 40 days the defenders are forced to surrender when a large stone falls from the walls and blocks the only water supply. 50,000 inhabitants are massacred or enslaved. Count Ermengol II of Urgel is left as governor on behalf of Sancho Ramirez of Aragon. Seville feels obliged to pay Christians tribute.
 The Taifa of Seville annexes the Taifa of Silves.
 1064Ferdinand I of León-Castile besieges Muslim Coimbra from 20 January 10649 July 1064. The Muslim governor who surrendered is allowed to leave with his family, but 5,000 inhabitants are taken captive, and all Muslims are forced out of Portuguese territory across the Mondego river.
 The Mozarabic (Christian) general Sisnando Davides, who led the siege of Coimbra, becomes Count of Coimbra.
 The Hispanic calendar is adopted.
 1065Civil War in Castile-León. In April Emir Al-Muqtadir of Zaragoza, aided by 500 Sevillian knights, besieges Barbastro. The governor, Count Ermengol II of Urgel, is killed in a sortie, and a few days later the city falls, whereupon the Iberian and French garrison is put to the sword, thus bringing an end to Pope Alexander II's prototype crusade. At around the same time Emir Al-Muqtadir breaks off relationships with Castile, and Ferdinand I leads a punitive expedition into Zaragozataking Alquezarand then into Valencia. Despite him being a tributary of Castile, Emir Mamun of Toledo leads to force in support of his son-in-law Emir Abd al-Malik. Mamun subsequently dethrones Abd al-Malik and incorporates Valencia into the Kingdom of Toledo. Ferdinand falls dangerously ill and retires from the field. King Ferdinand dies in León on 28 December 1065, and his empire is divided between his three sons: Sancho II in Castile, Alfonso VI in León, and Garcia in Galicia.
 1066Joseph ibn Naghrela, son of the Jewish Vizier Samuel ibn Naghrela Ha-Nagid, invites Al-Mutasim of Almería to come and rule in Granada. The Zirids of Sanhaja defeat the attempt and instigate a pogrom of the Jews in Granada.
 Joseph and other Jews in Granada are attacked and murdered; many escapees flee to the north. "More than 1,500 Jewish families, numbering 4,000 persons, fell in one day, December 30, 1066."
 1067The Castilian army under Sancho II and the Alferez Rodrigo Díaz de Vivar – already known as El Cid by this time – besiege Zaragoza. The siege is lifted after Emir Al-Muqtadir pays a large ransom and promises tribute. War of the three Sanchos: Castile versus Aragon and Navarre. Aragon severely mauls the Castilians at Viana, however status quo is restored when the Zaragozan Vali of Huesca invades Aragon from the south.
 1068Alfonso VI of León leads a campaign against Badajoz, but withdraws when Emir Mamun ibn Dhi-I-Nun of Toledo intercedes. Badajoz becomes tributary to León. Later the Emir of Badajoz dies and his two sons dispute the succession.
 1069Alfonso VI of León overruns Badajoz early in the year. Seville takes Córdoba. The army consists of an advance guard of 300 horses and a main body of 1000.
 1071Battle of Pedroso (between Braga and the River Cávado) where Garcia II of Galicia suppresses the rebellion of his Portuguese subjects under Count Nuno Mendes, last count of Portugal of the Vímara Peres House. Count Nuno Mendes is killed and Garcia II of Galicia proclaims himself King of Portugal. Sometime after 18 January 1071 and before May, Garcia II of Galicia is captured by his brother Sancho II of Castile (It is unclear if Garcia was captured in open battle at Santarém or by trickery). Garcia purchases his release and retires to the court of his tributary Al-Mutamid of Seville. Galicia is divided between his brothers Sancho and Alfonso.
 1073The Emir of Granada rejects the Castilian demand for tribute, however, Abbad III al-Mu'tamid, the Emir of Seville offers to pay instead. Consequently, a joint Muslim-Castilian force builds the fortress of Belillos, from which the garrison raid into Granada.
 1074Emir Al-Mutamid of Seville drives the Almoravids from Jaén.
 1075Toledo takes Córdoba from Seville with the help of Castilian troops.
 1076Emir Ahmad al-Muqtadir drives Slavs from Denia. Ferdinand I of León-Castile besieges Muslims and takes Coria in Badajoz. After the Emir of Toledo dies, Seville takes Córdoba back from his son al-Qadir.
 1078 Ibn Ammar acquires Murcia nominally on behalf of Seville but in reality as his own. Seville takes Valencia from Toledo. As a result, Al-Qadir of Toledo is forced from the city by a coup and his opponents acknowledge al-Mutawwakil of Badajoz as their new ruler. The Almoravids take Tangier. Ceuta hangs on as the last Zanata outpost because its fleet can supply it from sea.
 1079Battle of Cabra. Rodrigo Díaz, defeats the Emir Abd Allah of Granada, who was helped by the Castilian Count García Ordíñez.
 Battle of Coria. Alfonso VI (already king of Castile and León) defeats the Muslim Emir of Badajoz, Al-Mutawwakkil. Al-Mutawwakkil renounces control of Toledo and al-Qadir is reinstated. A Leonese garrison is established at Zorita to the east of Toledo.
 1080Ibn Ammar forced to flee Murcia.
 1081El Cid, now a mercenary because he had been exiled by Alfonso IV of Castile, enters the service of the Moorish king of the northeast Spanish city of Zaragosa, al-Mu'tamin, and would remain there for his successor, al-Mu'tamin II.
 1082Battle of Almenar. Rodrigo Díaz de Vivar, leading the army of Al-Mutamin of Zaragoza, defeats a combined army of the kings of Valencia (Al-Mundhir), Lleida (Al-Hayib), Aragon (Sancho Ramírez), and the Count of Barcelona (Berenguer Ramón II, who is captured). When Emir Al-Mutamid of Seville pays his tribute in debased coinage, Alfonso of León-Castile leads an expedition in Muslim territory.
 1083In June–July Almoravids take Ceutathe last outpost of the Zanataand put to death the ruler, al-Muizz ibn Badis. Ships from Seville may have aided the attack. The same summer Alfonso of León-Castile reaches Tarifa overlooking the Straits of Gibraltar. Castile under Alfonso VI of León and Castile takes Madrid.
 1084The Muslim army of Zaragoza under El Cid defeats the Aragonese. In autumn the Castilians start a loose siege of Toledo.
 1085Christians take Salamanca.
 Castile under Alfonso VI of León and Castile, Emperor of all Spains, takes Toledo.
 1086Several Muslim Emirs (namely Abbad III al-Mu'tamid) ask the Almoravid leader Yusuf ibn Tashfin for help against Alfonso VI of León and Castile. In this year Yusuf ibn Tashfin passed the straits to Algeciras and inflicted a severe defeat on the Christians at the Battle of az-Zallaqah (North of Badajoz). He was debarred from following up his victory by trouble in North Africa which he had to settle in person.
 Raymond of Burgundy, son of William I, Count of Burgundy, comes to Iberia for the 1st time to fight against the Moors, bringing with him his younger cousin Henry of Burgundy, grandson of Robert I, Duke of Burgundy.
 In spring the Castilians besiege Zaragoza, but the siege is called off when the Almoravids land in the south. In June the Almoravids advance guard of 500 men take possession of Algeciras. The remaining 12–20,000 soon follow. Castilians under Alvar Fañez install al-Qadir as Emir of Valencia.
 Almoravids, rampage through parts of Iberia, especially Granada and Lucena. There are persecutions and massacres. The wealthier Jews flee to Christian-held Iberia.
 The Christian advance obliges the Muslim kings of Granada, Seville and Badajoz to call to their aid the Almoravids.
 Battle of az-Zallaqah: At Sagrajas (Friday 23 October 1086) north-east of Badajoz, the Almoravids (12,000 or 20,000 men) under Yusuf ibn Tashfin and Andalusians (including Kings of Seville, Granada, Málaga, and Badajoz) defeat a predominantly Leonese-Castilian army (possibly 50–60,000 men including Jews, Aragonese, Italian and French) under Alfonso VI of León and Castile. The Andalusians encamp separately from the Almoravids. The Christian vanguard (Alvar Fañez) surprise the Andalusian camp before dawn; the men of Seville (Al-Mutamid) hold firm but the remaining Andalusians are chased off by the Aragonese cavalry. The Christian main body then attacks the Almoravids, but are held by the Lamtuma, and then withdraw to their own camp in response to an outflanking move by ibn Tashufin. The Aragonese return to the field, do not like what they see, and start a withdraw which turns to a rout. The Andalusians rally, and the Muslims drive Alfonso to a small hill. Alfonso and 500 knights escape in the night to Toledo. Al-Mutamid proposes that the Christians are pursued and crushed, but Ibn Tashufin retires back to his African domains leaving only 3,000 troops to defend the east of Al-Andalus. Al-Mutamid and the Almoravid generals Sir ibn Abi Bakr and Dawud ibn Aisha are reported to have fought well during the battle.
 1087Alfonso VI of León and Castile takes the fortress of Aledo in the territory of Murcia, blocking the route from Seville and Granada to the eastern provinces.
 After his crushing defeat at Zallaqa, Alfonso VI of León and Castile swallows his pride and recalls El Cid from exile.
 1088Yusuf ibn Tashfin arrives back in Algeciras (May–June) and is joined by al-Mutamid of Seville and Abd Allah of Granada, plus support from Almería and Murcia (but not the Emirs). The combined army besieges Aledo for 4 months, but Yusuf ibn Tashfin returns to Africa unsuccessful.
 1090Yusuf ibn Tashfin returns to the Peninsula for the third time, takes over the kingdoms of Granada and Málaga in September and is back in Africa by the end of the year. However, this time his nephew Sir ibn Abi Bakr is left to continue the conquest. Between 30 April 1090 and 8 May 1090, Christian troops enter Santarém, Lisbon and Sintra. These were recently ceded by the Al-Mutawwakil of Badajoz in return for protection from the Almoravids.
 Yusuf ibn Tashfin, King of the Almoravids, captures Granada.
 1091The Almoravids led by Muhammad ibn al-Hajj take Córdoba and the Guadalquivir valley early in the year, and then defeat a Castilian force under Álvar Fáñez who were attempting to aid Al-Mutamid of Seville. In September Seville surrenders without much of a fight to Muhammad ibn Abi Bakr. Subsequently, other Almoravids armies take Aledo and Almería. Ronda also falls and the Almoravid commander Garur executes al-Radi (the son al-Mutamid of Seville).
 The Taifa of Mértola falls to the Almoravids.
 1092With El Cid away in Zaragoza, the Valencians under the qadi Ibn Jahhaf and supported by a small Almoravid force, drive the Castilian garrison out and execute their Emir al-Qadir. Ibn Jahhaf promptly sets himself up at Emir and starts negotiating with both El Cid and the Almoravids.
 Toledo falls to the Reconquista and will remain in Christian hands thereafter
 1093An Almoravid army (Abu Bakr ibn Ibrahiim) approaches Valencia but then retreats without striking a blow.
 Almoravid Sir ibn Abi Bakr takes Badajoz and Lisbon. Fall of the Taifa of Badajoz.
 El Cid captures Valencia from the Moors, carving out his own kingdom along the Mediterranean that is only nominally subservient to Alfonso VI of León and Castile. Valencia would be both Christian and Muslim, with adherents of both religions serving in his army.
 The Almoravids from Morocco land near Cuarte and lay siege to Valencia with 50,000 men. El Cid, however, breaks the siege and forces the Almoravids to flee – the first Christian victory against the hard-fighting Africans.
 1095The Almoravids take Santarém.
 1097El Cid defeats Almoravid (Ali ibn al-Hajj) at the Battle of Bairén south of Valencia.
 Almoravid (Muhammad ibn al-Hajj) defeat Castilians (Alfonso VI) at Consuegra. El Cid's son, Diego, is one of the dead.
 Almoravid (Muhammad ibn Aisha) defeat Castilians (Alva Fañez) at Cuenca before ravaging the lands of Valencia.
 Yusuf ibn Tashfin assumes the title of Amir al Muslimin (Prince of the Muslims).
 1099The Almoravids besiege El Cid's Valencia, where he dies on 10 July 1099.
 1100Molina falls to the Reconquista and will remain in Christian hands thereafter
 Beginning of 12th centuryAccording to estimates, the Muslim population in Iberia may have reached 5.5 million, including Arabs, Berber and indigenous converts.
 1102The followers of El Cid leave Valencia and the Muslims occupy the Peninsula as far as Zaragoza; Battle of Mollerussa near Lleida on 14 September.
 Main Muslim mosque in Toledo converted to a church, Muslim population is sparse.
 Christians evacuate Valencia in April–May. Almoravid (Mazdali, presumably ibn Tilankan; Muhammad ibn Fatima) occupy the city. Of the Taifa states only Zaragoza, Majorca, and Albarracin remain independent.
 1103Ali, the brother of the Almoravid governor of Granada, Muhammad ibn al-Hajj, is killed in battle with the Castilians near Talavera.
 1105The Almohads, founded by Ibn Tumart, began as a religious movement to rid Islam of impurities. Most specifically, the Almohads were opposed to anthropomorphisms which had slipped into Iberian Islam. Ibn Tumart's successor, Abd al-Mu'min, turned the movement against non-Muslims, specifically Jews and Christians. Sweeping across North Africa and into Muslim Iberia, the zealous Almohads initiate riots and persecutions of both Muslims and non-Muslims. In some towns Jews and Christians are given the choice of conversion, exile, or death.
 1106Yusuf ibn Tashfin dies and his son, Ali, takes over the Almoravid empire.
 1108The Almoravids under Tamim ibn Yusuf ibn Tashfin, the brother of the ruler; another general is Muhammad ibn Fatima, the grandson of Sir ibn Abi Bakr, take the small town of Uclés to the east of Toledo, but a ridge top fortress holds out. Alfonso VI of León and Castile sends a relieving army under Alvar Fañez. The Almoravids decisively beat the Castilians and many leaders are killed, including Sancho, Alfonso's only son (by Zaïda, a Muslim princess) and heir. Subsequently, the Almoravids pretend to withdraw then launch a successful surprise attack on the castle. As a result, the Christians abandon Cuenca and Huete.
 Almoravid (Tamim ibn Yusuf ibn Tashfin) storm Talavera on the Tagus to the west of Toledo. The country to the north and south of Toledo is ravaged and the city unsuccessfully besieged for a month. Alvar Fañez leads the defence. Emir Ali ibn Yusuf ibn Tashfin joined this year's Jihad but does not mention him in the actions.
 1110Al-Mustain of Zaragoza leads an expedition against the Christians, but is killed at Valtierra. His son, Imad al-Din, fails to establish his rule and the Almoravid (ibn al-Hajj) marches in (30 May 1110).
 1111Almoravids led by Sir ibn Abi Bakr occupy Lisbon and Santarém in the west. These cities were occupied by the Almoravids in 1094-95 this suggests a fluctuating border in Portugal.
 Henry, Count of Portugal grants city rights and privileges to Coimbra and captures Santarém to the Moors.
 1112By this time the Aragonese have taken Huesca. Almoravid (ibn al-Hajj) raids into Aragonese territory and reaches the foothills of the Pyrenees.
 1114A major Almoravid expedition (ibn al-Hajj from Zaragoza and Ibn Aisha of Valencia) raids into Catalonia. The army ravages Christian territory but is ambushed on its return and both Almoravid generals are killed. The Catalans under Count Ramon Berengar III take over the Balearic Islands upon the death of Emir Mubashir ibn Sulayman of Majorca.
 The Taifa of Beja and Évora becomes independent.
 1115The new Almoravid governor of Zaragoza, Abu Bakr ibn Ibrahim ibn Tifilwit, lays siege to Barcelona for 20 days. The Almoravids withdraw when Count Ramon Berengar III returns from Majorca. The Almoravid fleet takes the Balearic Islands. The Almoravid general and governor of Granada Mazdali ibn Tilankan dies in battle this year. He led expeditions against the Christians from 1111, so he might have led an expedition separate from those of Abu Bakr and the fleet. His son, Muhammad, governor of Córdoba, also dies in battle this year (against the Castilians), so it may have been the same expedition.
 1117Almoravids under Emir Ali ibn Yusuf himself take Coimbra, but abandon the city after a few days.
 1118Alfonso I of Aragon takes Saragossa from the Muslims. Settlers in the reconquered no-man's lands of Castile are granted fueros, special rights.
 The Aragonese led AlfonsoI the Battler seize Zaragoza and most of the central lands of the Ebro. The siege of Zaragoza lasts from 22 May 1118 to 18 December 1118. The garrison has 20 mangonels and is supported by a determined militia. As a result of a plea for help of 3 December the Almoravid governor of Valencia sends a relief force, but this is too small to help. Lleida only remains in Muslim hands because it is tributary to Barcelona.
 Zaragoza falls to the Reconquista and will remain in Christian hands thereafter
 1120Alfonso I of Aragon decisively defeats an Almoravid army including many Andalusian volunteers at Cutanda in summer.
 1121The Aragonese take Calatayud. The Córdobans rebel against the Almoravids, and drive the governor and his troops from the city. The Emir Ali ibn Yusuf ibn Tashfin leads an army from Africa to suppress the rebellion. The Almoravids besiege the city, and persuade the Córdobans to lay down their arms.
 1122Aragonese take Daroca.
 1125In September, Alfonso I of Aragon sets out south with an army of 4,000 knights. He travels down the east coast, bypasses the cities and ravages the countryside. He reaches Guadix unopposed in December.
 1126The Almoravids deport Christians to Morocco.
 Alfonso I of Aragon defeats the Almoravids at Arinzul near Lucena. After symbolically fishing at Motril on the south coast, Alfonso returns home undefeated.
 1129Alfonso I of Aragon defeats an Almoravid army led by Ali ibn Majjuz, the governor of Seville deep inside Valencian territory. This is probably at Cullera or Alcalá near Alzira.

Decline and submission to Christian rule (1130–1481)
 1130Tashfin ibn Ali ibn Yusuf (the son of the Almoravid Emir) takes the castle of Aceca south of Toledo. The Almoravid (Governor of Valencia) defeat invading Aragonese and kill Gaston IV of Béarn of the First Crusade.
 1133The Christian militia of Toledo reach the gates of Seville and kill the Almoravid governor (Abu Hafs Umar ibn Ali ibn al-Hajj). Further damage is averted by the intervention of Tashfin ibn Ali ibn Yusuf.
 1134Almoravid (Tashfin ibn Ali ibn Yusuf) raids in the Caceres area.
 Aragonese Alfonso I of Aragon besiege the small town of Fraga. An Almoravid relief army (Yahya ibn Ali ibn Ghaniya) defeats the overconfident Aragonese, and a sally of the garrison destroys the besiegers' camp. Alfonso I of Aragon is ambushed while raiding Lleida and is severely wounded and dies soon after.
 1135Birth of Rabbi Moses Ben Maimon (called "Rambam" or Moses Maimonides).
 1136Almoravid (Yahya ibn Ali ibn Ghaniya; Sa'd ibn Mardanish) retakes Mequinenza on the lower Ebro.
 1137Almoravid (Tashfin ibn Ali ibn Yusuf) defeat the Castilians near Alcázar de San Juan and sack the castle at Escalona north of the Tagus.
 Prince Afonso I of Portugal tries and fails to take Lisbon from the Moors.
 1139Battle of Ourique between the Portuguese, led by Afonso I of Portugal, and the Almoravids, led by Ali ibn Yusuf.
 1140Poema del Mio Cid written.
 King Afonso I of Portugal tries and fails to take Lisbon from the Moors.
 1144The Muridun ("Disciples") under Abul-Qasim Ahmad ibn al-Husayn al-Qasi rebel in the Algarve. Ibn al-Mundhir takes Silves in his name, and the governor of Beja, Sidray ibn Wazir, also supports him. Ibn al-Mundhir and Sidray ibn Wazir kill the garrison of Monchique castle, and 70 men take Mértola by surprise (12 Aug). Soon after, the Andalusian governor of Niebla, Yusuf ibn Ahmad al-Bitruji declares for the Muridun. The Almoravid Yahya ibn Ali ibn Ghaniya drives the Muridun back from Seville, and afterwards Sidray ibn Wazir splits off from the other Muridun.
 The Taifa of Mértola and of Silves again become independent.
 1145The Córdobans evict the Almoravid governor at the beginning of the year and raise up Hamdin ibn Huhammad ibn Hamdin as Emir. A Zaragozan adventurer in Castilian employ (Sayf al-Dawla ibn Hud al-Mustansir) briefly seizes power from ibn Hamdin in March but flees to the Levante due to popular hostility. Ibn Hamdin returns to power but is soon dispossessed by the Almoravid (Yahya ibn Ali ibn Ghaniya). In March the Andalusian Jund in Valencia raise up the qadi Marwan ibn Abd al-Aziz as Emir. When he cannot pay them they replace him with their own leader Ibn Iyad.
 Portugal retakes Leiria from the Moors.
 The Taifa of Badajoz again becomes independent and takes the Taifa of Mértola.
 1146Al-Mustansir accepts the crowns of Valencia and Murcia from the hands of Ibn Iyad. The Christians defeat the Valencians (Al-Mustansir) near Albacete killing Al-Mustansir in the process. Ibn Iyad reassumes the title of Emir. Ibn Iyad dies in an obscure conflict and Muhammad ibn Sa'd ibn Mardanish becomes ruler.
 The Taifa of Mértola gains independence from Badajoz.
 1147Alfonso VII of Castile takes Calatrava.
 MarchKing Afonso I of Portugal takes the Taifa of Santarém in a surprise attack.
 Santarém falls to the Reconquista and will remain in Christian hands thereafter
 An international Christian coalition attacks Almería by land and sea. Alfonso VII of Castile and Sancho Ramirez of Navarre march overland taking Andújar and Baeza en route. Ramon Berengar IV of Aragon-Catalonia and a Genoese naval contingent join them at Almería. There is no opposition from the Almoravid fleet. Almería falls on 17 Oct and is given to the Genoese.
 A Crusaders' fleet arrives at the Portuguese city of Porto, and are convinced to join King Afonso I of Portugal in the Siege of Lisbon, which falls after several months. Some Muslims are killed, and the city was thoroughly plundered by the Crusaders.
 Lisbon falls to the Reconquista and will remain in Christian hands thereafter
 The towns of Almada and Palmela, just south of Lisbon, are taken from the Moors by the Portuguese.
 1148Almohads take Seville. Aragonese take Tortosa.
 1149Aragonese take Lleida and Fraga.
 A new Berber dynasty, the Almohads, led by Emir Abd al-Mu'min al-Kumi, takes North Africa from the Almoravids and soon invades the Iberian Peninsula.
 1150The Taifas of Badajoz and of Beja and Évora are taken by the Almohads.
 1151The Almohads, another more conservative African Muslim dynasty who have displaced the Almoravids, retake Almería. Jews and Mozárabes (Christians in Muslim lands) flee to the northern Christian kingdoms of Spain, or to Africa and the East, including Rambam.
 King Afonso I of Portugal tries and fails to take Alcácer do Sal from the Moors.
 The Taifa of Mértola is taken by the Almohads.
 1155Almohads take Granada from Almoravids.
 The Taifa of Silves is taken by the Almohads.
 1157Almohads take Almería from Genoese.
 1158King Afonso I of Portugal takes Alcácer do Sal from the Moors.
 1159Évora and Beja, in the southern province of Alentejo, are taken from the Moors by the Portuguese.
 1160Maimonides and his family took refuge in Fez in Morocco, which had been spared by the Almohads.
 1161Évora, Beja and Alcácer do Sal are retaken by the Moors.
 1162King Afonso I of Portugal retakes Beja from the Moors.
 1163The Almohad Caliph Abd al-Mu'min al-Kumi dies and is succeeded by Abu Ya'qub Yusuf I.
 1165Faked conversions become widespread with the accession of the sultan Abu Yakub. His son, Yakub Al-Mansur (1184–1199) imposes several restrictions upon the new converts. They could marry only among themselves and were forbidden to engage in large-scale trading, Doubting the sincerity of their conversion, in 1198, he also ordered them to wear a special degrading garb: a blue tunic one cubit long with ridiculously long wide sleeves. The converts were compelled to wear a blue skullcap which fell below their ears in the shape of a donkey's packsaddle, instead of the usual turbans.
 1165Maimonides and his family leave Fez.
 The Portuguese armies, led by Geraldo the Fearless, retake Évora from the Moors.
 1166The Portuguese armies take Serpa and Moura (in Alentejo) from the Moors.
 1168Portuguese frontiersman Geraldo the Fearless goes into the territory of Badajoz.
 1169King Afonso I of Portugal grants the Knights Templar one third of all they take from the Moors in Alentejo.
 Geraldo the Fearless seizes Badajoz from the Almohads.
 King Afonso I of Portugal is wounded by a fall from his horse in Badajoz, and is captured by the competing forces of King Ferdinand II of León. As ransom King Afonso I was obliged to surrender almost all the conquests he had made in Galicia in the previous years, as well as Badajoz, that the Leonese gave back to the Almohads as a vassal territory.
 1170The Almohads transfer their capital to Seville.
 1171Almohad Muslims begin building the Alcázar, their palace.
 1172Almohads capture Murcia. Almohads take over Valencia when ibn Mardanish dies.
 1179Castile and Aragon agree on future partition of Al-Andalus.
 1184The Portuguese defeat the Almohads at Santarém.
 Yusuf I, Almohad Caliph, dies and is succeeded by Abu Yusuf Ya'qub al-Mansur.
 1190Maimonides writes the Moreh Nebukhim, or Guide to the Perplexed, using rationalism to reconcile Judaism with Aristotle's laws of nature, and Shloshah-Asar Ikkarim, the Thirteen Articles of Faith.
 1195The Almohads defeat the Castilians at Alarcos.
 1199The Almohad Caliph Abu Yusuf Ya'qub al-Mansur dies and is succeeded by Muhammad an-Nasir.
 1200Ibn Tumart's successor, Abd al-Mumin, turned the movement against non-Muslims, specifically Jews and Christians. Sweeping across North Africa and into Muslim Iberia, the zealous Almohads initiated riots and persecutions of Muslims and non-Muslims. In some towns Jews and Christians were given the choice of conversion, exile, or death.
 1203The Almohads take Majorca from the Almoravid.
 1205Death of Maimonides in Egypt.
 1212Battle of Las Navas de Tolosa: Alfonso VIII of Castile, Sancho VII of Navarre, Pedro II of Aragon and Afonso II of Portugal, defeat Almohad (Caliph Muhammad an-Nasir) at the Battle of Las Navas de Tolosa. The Christians had 60-100,000 infantry and 10,000 cavalry, and had troops from Western Europe, Castile, Navarre, Aragon, León and Portugal, Military Orders (Knights Templar, Knights Hospitaller, Santiago, Cavatrava), and urban militias.
 After the defeat the Almohad empire goes into a serious decline in Spain and in North Africa.
 1213Abu Ya'qub Yusuf II becomes Almohad Caliph.
 1217The Portuguese take the town of Alcácer do Sal from the Moors.
 12171252Fernando III, king of Castile and León, conquers Córdoba, Murcia, Jaén, and Seville. Granada remains as the sole independent Muslim kingdom.
 1227Denia falls to the Reconquista and will remain in Christian hands thereafter.
 The Muslim governor of Murcia, Ibn Hud, becomes the leader of rebellions against the Almohad rulers.
 1228Badajoz falls to the Reconquista and will remain in Christian hands thereafter.
 Ibn Hud establishes himself emir of Murcia.
 1229James I of Aragon, the Conqueror, retakes Majorca, Jerica and Murviedro-Sagunto which will remain in Christian hands thereafter.
 1230Alfonso IX of Leon advances along the River Guadiana, takes Mérida and Badajoz, and opens up the way for the conquest of Seville.
 1230Castilian forces under Ferdinand III of Castile fail in an attempt to conquer the city of Jaén from the Taifa of Jayyān when the Castilian forces withdrew upon hearing news of the death of Alfonso IX of León.
 1232Ibiza falls to the Reconquista and will remain in Christian hands thereafter.
 Mohammed ibn Alhamar proclaims himself sultan of Arjona and founds the Nasrid dynasty.
 1233Castile defeats Granada at the Battle of Jerez.
 1236Portugal captures most of the Algarve.
 Castile forces under Ferdinand III of Castile recapture Córdoba which will remain in Christian hands thereafter. Ibn Hud is forced to sign a truce.
 Castilian forces include urban militia.
 The Nasrid ruler, Mohammed ibn Alhamar, approaches Ferdinand III of Castile to propose that in return for cooperating in the conquest of Muslim Seville, Granada would be granted independence as a subject of Castile.  Fernando agrees and takes Seville.
 1237Mohammed ibn Alhamar enters Granada, soon to become the new capital of his dominion. On returning to Granada, the embarrassed ibn-Alhamar announces "there is no victor but Allah", which was to become the motto of the Nasrid dynasty and to be inscribed all over the Alhambra palace.
 1238Aragon captures Valencia. Aragonese forces include urban militia.
 The Emirate of Granada is officially founded.
 James I retakes Valencia, Albarracin, Alpuente, Tortosa from the Muslims, all of which would remain in Christian hands thereafter. He also gains control of the prized paper manufacturing centre at Xàtiva.
 1243James I retakes Murcia from the Moors and it will remain in Christian control thereafter.
 1244Arjona and Baeza fall to the Reconquista and will remain in Christian hands thereafter.
 James I of Aragon captures the Xativa Castle and city from Abu Bakr who signs the Treaty of Xàtiva effectively becoming a vassal to the Christian Kingdom.
 1245Muslim troubles start in Valencia.
 Muslim commander Al-Azraq surrenders to James I of Aragon and signs the Al-Azraq Treaty of 1245. Cartagena was captured by Aragon and will remain in Christian control thereafter.
 1246Carmona falls to the Reconquista and will remain in Christian hands thereafter
 Jaén is handed over by Mohammed ibn Alhamar to Ferdinand III of Castile. They sign the Treaty of Jaén, which establishes the Emirate of Granada as vassal state of Castile.
 1247Having had time to secretly regroup his forces Al-Azraq breaks the treaty that he had signed in 1245 and leads a revolt in Valencia.
 The Muslim rebels in Valencia retreat into the territory controlled by the Mudéjar lord Al-Azraq who holds 8 castles in the Alcalá valley. They seize more castles and continue a successful guerrilla war.
 1248Christian armies under Ferdinand III of Castile take Seville after 16 months of siege, despite Muslim catapults, Greek fire, and bowmen who pierce armor. Castilian forces include urban militia.
 4 December, Alfonso X the Wise reconquest Alicante to Castile.
 1249King Afonso III of Portugal takes Faro (in the Algarve) from the Moors, thus removing the last Muslim state from Portuguese soil and ending the Portuguese Reconquista.
 The Muslims fend off a major Christian offensive under King James I of Aragon.
 Orihuela falls to the Reconquista and will remain in Christian hands thereafter.
 1250Tejada, Constantina, Huelva and Jerez fall to the Reconquista and will remain in Christian hands thereafter.
 12521284Alfonso X the Wise continues the Christian reconquest of the peninsula and is obliged to face the Mudéjar revolts of Andalusia and Murcia. He seeks election as emperor of the Holy Roman Empire in 1257. He drafts the Fuero de las Leyes, the forerunner of the Siete Partidas.
 1256Fighting flares up between the Valencia rebels and the Aragonese.
 1257Muslims use some form of incendiary weapon at Niebla.
 1258King James I of Aragon takes al-Azraq's main citadel and suppresses the Valencian rebellion.
 1262Niebla and Cádiz falls to the Reconquista and will remain in Christian hands thereafter.
 1264Muslim revolt in Andalusia.
 1266Lorca, Murcia, Purchena and Segura are retaken from the Muslims and will remain in Christian hands thereafter.
 1275Four Marinid expeditions to Iberia.
 Muslims defeat Christians at the Battle of Ecija.
 1276Muslim revolt in Valencia.
 1280Muslim Granadian forces under the command of Muhammad II defeat invading Christian forces under the command of Gonzalo Ruiz Girón at the Battle of Moclín.
 1280Muslims use some form of incendiary weapon at Córdoba.
 1287Menorca falls to the Reconquista and will remain in Christian hands thereafter.
 1292Castile captures Tarifa from Marinids.

 1306Muslims use some form of incendiary weapon at Gibraltar.
 1309Ferdinand IV of Castile takes Gibraltar.
 Algeciras falls to the Reconquista and will remain in Christian hands thereafter.
 1310Castile captures Gibraltar.
 1312–1350War between Alfonso XI and Granada:-
 1319Granada defeats Castilian invasion.
 1324Catalonia occupies Sardinia.
 1325Alfonso XI decides to avenge the defeat against his army in 1319. His armies re-attack Granada. This time, they are victorious and manage to defeat Muhammad IV.
 1331Granada uses iron balls propelled by fire or containing fire against Alicante and Orihuela.
 1333Granada retakes Gibraltar from the Castilians.
 1340The combined armies of King Afonso IV of Portugal and King Alfonso XI of Castille defeat a Muslim army at the Battle of Rio Salado.
 1343Granada uses cannons in the (unsuccessful) defence of Algeciras.
 1394Battle of Egea. Granadine troops become the first troops in Iberia to use handguns.
 1410An attack against Granada is led by Ferdinand, regent of Castile and future king of Aragon. He does not take Granada, but he takes the city of Antequera. This is considered the most important victory against the Muslims since the reign of Alfonso XI.
 1415Portugal takes the city of Ceuta in North Africa.
 1462Castile takes Gibraltar again.

Castile-Aragón conquers the emirate of Granada (1481–1491) 
 26 December 1481The Granadines (Emir Abu l-Hasan Ali) surprise the Castilian garrison of Zahara on a stormy night. The population is enslaved.
 1482Forces of Castile–Aragon (2500 cavalry and 3000 infantry) under Rodrigo Ponce de León, Marquis of Cadiz gather at Marchena (25 Feb), march to Antequera, cross the Sierra Alzerifa, and then seize Granadine Alhama on a stormy night before dawn (28 February 1482). Abu l-Hasan attempts to retake Alhama by siege (5–19 March) but withdraws unsuccessfully to Granada. Muslim troops from Ronda raid the Arcos area to try to tempt the Marquis out of Alhama. In support of his men at Alhama, King Ferdinand marches to Lucena, sends reinforcements to Alhama (30 April 1482), withdraws to Córdoba to organise a major force, and then formally takes over Alhama (14 May 1482).
 Siege of Loja. King Ferdinand II of Aragon attacks the Granadine city of Loja (1 July 1482). The city is defended by one Ibrahim Ali al-Attar, octogenarian father-in-law of Muhammad XII. Ferdinand II of Aragon returns to Córdoba. Abu l-Hasan marches on Loja and sweeps the Rio Frio in mid July.
 1483Battle of Axarquia. A fast moving Castilian force raids into the mountains of Axarquia. Emir Muhammad XII of Granada becomes the first King of Granada to be captured by the Christians.
 1484The Castilian-Aragónese army led by King Ferdinand II of Aragon assembles at Antequera in Spring, marches to Álora, raids Coín, Cazabonela, Almjia, Cártama, Pupiana, Alhendrin, and the fertile valley of Málaga before returning to Antequera. They capture Álora and Senetil and raid into the fertile valley of Granada.
 1485Al-Zagal drives Muhammad XII from Almería. Muhammad XII flees to King Ferdinand II of Aragon, at Córdoba. Ferdinand besieges Coín and Cártama.  Al-Zagal then attempts to relieve the sieges, but first Coín falls (27 April 1485) then Cártama (28 April 1485). The garrison of Ronda raids Medina Sidonia but returns to find its city besieged by Ferdinand in early May.  Abu Hasan of Granada dies and Al-Zagal assumes title of Emir in late May; Al-Zagal defeats a Christian foraging party from Alhama on his way to Granada. Three groups of Castilian–Aragonese march toward Moclin (late Aug). Al-Zagal ambushes and defeats the first group, although it is rescued by the second group of Christians in early September.  Al-Zagal enters Moclin. The third Castilian-Aragonese group (Ferdinand) joins the other two and they take the castles of Cambil and Albahar (23 September 1485).  The Castilian-Aragonese of Alhama also take the castle of Zalea in September.
 1487Málaga falls to the Reconquista after the Siege of Málaga (1487).
 1489Spain captures Baza. Al-Zagal surrenders to Spain.
 Almería falls to the Reconquista.
 1491Granada surrenders to the Castilian-Aragonese forces. Abu 'abd Allah Muhammad XII, Emir of Granada, relinquishes the last Muslim-controlled city in the Iberian Peninsula to the expanding Crown of Castile, and signs the Treaty of Granada.

Aftermath (1492–1614) 
 2 January 1492The Catholic Monarchs, Queen Isabella I of Castile and King Ferdinand II of Aragon, take over Granada.
 1492–1507The remaining Muslims in the Crown of Castile were ordered to become Catholic. King Ferdinand ordered to convert mosques to Christian churches. The king then appeals to the reigning Pope Julius II (nephew of Sixtus IV) to grant the aspirations of these new Christians. This new Christian population, forcibly converted, will come to be known as the Moriscos. Jews who were forcefully converted are known as marranos. Hundreds of thousands of Jews who did not accept conversion were expelled from Spain. They fled with nothing more than the clothes on their backs for the Ottoman Empire, Italy, Egypt and other areas.
 1496All Muslims (and Jews) in Portugal were expelled from Portugal.
 1499-1501A Muslim rebellion in Granada, following forced conversion of Muslims, contrary to terms of surrender; The rebellion was defeated in 1501.
 1501-1502 All Muslims in the Crown of Castile (including the former Emirate of Granada) were forced to convert to Christianity.
 1504The Oran fatwa was issued, following the forced conversion of 1501–1502, providing the basis of the secret practice of Islam in Spain.
 1516King Charles I, the grandson of Ferdinand and Isabella, rises to the throne of both Castile and Aragon.  With the conquest of Granada and Iberian Navarre, the modern state of Spain is formed. Muslims in the kingdom of Navarre are forced to convert. 
 15191522Revolt of the Brotherhoods in the Kingdom of Valencia. A middle-class rebellion simultaneously targeting the noble landed class and Muslim peasantry, resulting in the killing and forced conversions of many of the latter, known as Mudéjars.
 1525Muslims in the Crown of Aragon are forced to convert to Christianity as a concession to the old-Christian guilds or Germanías which had revolted a few years earlier.
 1526After convening a council to examine the problem, King Charles I declares that the forced conversions of the Muslims of Valencia and Aragon were valid, because they could have chosen death rather than convert.
 1568Rebellion of the Alpujarras. After King Philip II introduces laws prohibiting Moorish culture, the people who had forcefully converted to Christianity in order to remain in Spain, then known as Moriscos, revolt under the leadership of Aben Humeya in Granada. The rebellion is suppressed in 1571 by John of Austria, Philip II's half-brother, and rebels are deported to different parts of the northern half of the Iberian peninsula.
 1570 Around 80,000 Moriscos are deported from the Kingdom of Granada resettled in towns and villages throughout Andalusia and Castile.
 1609Expulsion of the MoriscosKing Philip III issues the Act of Expulsion for all remaining Moriscos, claiming that they appealed to the Ottoman Empire for military intervention in Spain.  They are viewed by some as a fifth column trying to rebuild the Muslim state in the Peninsula.
 1614The process of expulsion ends.

See also
 Timeline of Córdoba, Andalusia
 Timeline of Seville

Notes

Bibliography 
 
  God's Crucible: Islam and the Making of Europe, 570–1215 (2008) by David Levering Lewis, W.W. Norton, 473 pp.

 
Muslim
Muslim

Berber history

Warfare of the Middle Ages
Islam in Portugal
Islam in Spain
Iberian